Saidulla Khan Dehlavi was a Pakistani career diplomat.

Career

He was a senior member of the Pakistan Foreign Service when he retired in 2001 as Ambassador to the European Union. He served as Pakistan's Ambassador to France and as Permanent Delegate to UNESCO. He also served as Ambassador to Switzerland, the Vatican, Yugoslavia, Albania and Ireland. Other postings were to Ankara and New Delhi, and as Director of the Foreign Minister's Office and Director General for South Asia in the Ministry of Foreign Affairs. Dehlavi received international decorations, including the Légion d'Honneur from France. He spoke French, Italian and Turkish. He was appointed member of Aga Khan University Board of Trustees in 2000 and became its Chairman from July 2001 until his death in February 2014.

External links 
 Ambassador Saidullah Khan Dehlavi – Chairman Board of Trustees (Board of Trustees section, AKU website accessed on 5.3.14)
 In Memoriam: Ambassador Saidullah Khan Dehlavi in the Ismailimail's blog of 6.2.14
 A Leading Light authored by Zubeida Mustafa in Pakistan's daily "Dawn" of 12.2.14
 Obituary in Le Monde of 10.2.14: "Les nombreux amis de Saidullah Khan Dehlavi, chevalier de la Legion d'honneur, ont la tristesse d'annoncer le deces a Karachi, le 4 fevrier 2014, de ce grand diplomate pakistanais qui fut notamment ambassadeur a Paris de 1991 a 1998. Il a contribue au resserrement des liens entre son pays et la France ainsi qu'au rayonnement des cultures pakistanaises et francaises."
France's "Le Monde" daily's archives from 1963 - 2014 on the subject of Samiullah Khan Dehlavi and Jamil Dehlavi

Pakistani diplomats
Muhajir people
1941 births
2014 deaths